In rock climbing and ice climbing, a pitch is a steep section of a route that requires a rope between two belays, as part of a climbing system. Standard climbing ropes are between 50 and 80 metres long, so a pitch is always shorter, between two convenient ledges if possible; longer routes are multi-pitch, requiring the re-use of the rope each time. In free climbing, pitch refers to classification by climbers of the difficulty of ascent on certain climbing routes.

In climbing
In advanced climbing or mountaineering, another definition of pitch is not restricted by the length of the rope. On easier terrain or when moving quickly, the length of a pitch can be extended by means of simul climbing, effectively combining several pitches together by means of a running belay. Speed climbers will often state that they completed a long route with a reduced number of pitches, effectively calling a pitch any time a fixed belay was used or a changeover in the lead occurred. This definition is used loosely, since the length of a pitch is only limited by the nature of the terrain and the confidence of the individual climbing party.

In caving 

The term pitch is also used by cavers to refer to a very steep or vertical section (called a drop, pit, or shaft) in a cave that needs ladders or single rope technique to descend and ascend (a drop that can be descended and ascended without equipment is a climb). As caving rope lengths are not standardized, the length of a pitch is usually equal to that of the drop.

In some cases, cavers may choose to split one drop into two or more distinct pitches. However in most cases a single rope or ladder is used for the entire drop, so in practical usage, pitch has become synonymous with the terms drop, pit or shaft. In England, the term pot is often used to refer to a pitch, although this may also refer to the entire cave, particularly in northern areas where vertical caves are predominant.

While a pitch refers to a drop that can be descended, the term aven refers to a pitch when discovered from below. If not free-climbable, avens can be ascended by means of a bolt climb, where a caver places an ascending series of bolts in the walls and gradually ascends to the top. A rope can then be rigged to the bottom, allowing following cavers to pass the obstacle. Some avens have been tackled by lifting ropes or ladders using long poles (Maypoling). Narrow avens can be climbed by pushing against opposite walls (chimneying).

See also
Multi-pitch climbing
Grade (climbing)

References

External links
 The world's deepest pitches, by Bob Gulden 
 Caves with the deepest drop, by Jochen Duckeck

Climbing
Caving